John Vincent Pardon (born June 1989) is an American mathematician who works on geometry and topology. He is primarily known for having solved Gromov's problem on distortion of knots, for which he was awarded the 2012 Morgan Prize. He is currently a permanent member of the Simons Center for Geometry and Physics and a full professor of mathematics at Princeton University.

Education and accomplishments
Pardon's father, William Pardon, is a mathematics professor at Duke University, and when Pardon was a high school student at the Durham Academy he also took classes at Duke. He was a three-time gold medalist at the International Olympiad in Informatics, in 2005, 2006, and 2007. In 2007, Pardon placed second in the Intel Science Talent Search competition, with a generalization to rectifiable curves of the carpenter's rule problem for polygons. In this project, he showed that every rectifiable Jordan curve in the plane can be continuously deformed into a convex curve without changing its length and without ever allowing any two points of the curve to get closer to each other. He published this research in the Transactions of the American Mathematical Society in 2009.

Pardon then went to Princeton University, where after his sophomore year he primarily took graduate-level mathematics classes.
At Princeton, Pardon solved a problem in knot theory posed by Mikhail Gromov in 1983 about whether every knot can be embedded into three-dimensional space with bounded stretch factor. Pardon showed that, on the contrary, the stretch factor of certain torus knots could be arbitrarily large.
His proof was published in the Annals of Mathematics in 2011, and earned him the Morgan Prize of 2012. Pardon also took part in a Chinese-language immersion program at Princeton, and was part of Princeton's team at an international debate competition in Singapore, broadcast on Chinese television. As a cello player he was a two-time winner of the Princeton Sinfonia concerto competition.  He graduated in 2011, as Princeton's valedictorian.

He went to Stanford University for his graduate studies, where his accomplishments included solving the three-dimensional case of the Hilbert–Smith conjecture. He completed his Ph.D. in 2015, under the supervision of Yakov Eliashberg,
and continued at Stanford as an assistant professor. In 2015, he was also appointed to a five-year term as a Clay Research Fellow.

Since fall 2016 (age 27), he has been a full professor of mathematics at Princeton University.

Awards and honors
In 2017, Pardon received National Science Foundation Alan T. Waterman Award for his contributions to geometry and topology.

He was elected to the 2018 class of fellows of the American Mathematical Society. Also in 2018 he was an invited speaker at the International Congress of Mathematicians in Rio de Janeiro. In 2022 he was awarded the Clay Research Award.

Selected publications
.
.
.
.

References

External links
Home page of John Pardon at Princeton, with 11 papers
21 Questions With … John Pardon ’11, University Press Club, Princeton

1989 births
21st-century American mathematicians
Princeton University alumni
Stanford University alumni
Stanford University faculty
Topologists
Geometers
People from Chapel Hill, North Carolina
Living people
Princeton University faculty
Fellows of the American Mathematical Society
Mathematicians from North Carolina
Competitive programmers